Rendezvous is a collaborative studio album by American jazz singer Cassandra Wilson and jazz pianist Jacky Terrasson. The album was released on 23 September 1997 by Blue Note label. The album includes mostly jazz and pop standards with one track written by Terrasson. The album's title derives from an obscure Herbie Hancock's ballad.

Recording
Recordings were made on January 4, 5, 6, and 19, and April 4, 1997 at Clinton Recording Studios in New York City. All the songs were arranged by Jacky Terrasson. The music material was recorded and mixed on analog recorder recorders (A800 and A880) without noise reduction; also no equalizers were used during mastering.

Reception
Jonathan Tabak of OffBeat commented "Terrasson’s piano draws more blues out of Wilson’s voice than the electric guitar to which she’s accustomed. Here she sounds like a more fragile Nina Simone. She seems to be kissing each syllable goodbye with heart-rending tenderness, as though she doesn’t want to release her soul’s bounty until the last possible moment. Rendezvous reminds us that a thousand delicate whispers have greater romantic impact than a single shout". Adam Shatz of The New York Times called the release "a luckluster album of standards". Don Heckman of The Los Angeles Times stated "The mood throughout the album is dark and thoughtful. These are not interpretations that reach out to grab the listeners. But there are ample rewards for listeners willing to take the time to go with Terrasson's and Wilson's always mesmerizing readings".

Suzanne McElfresh of Vibe added "Rendezvous is technically a collaboration, but this disc is an affair far more Jacky Terrasson's and Cassandra Wilson's". Bret Primack in his review for JazzTimes stated, "Wilson is simply brilliant, her deep, smoky voice caressing each note and syllable. When she chooses, she creates immense emotional tension, just by holding back. In just a few short years, Cassandra Wilson has become the voice of the era and certain to be a major force in the 21st century." The Buffalo News review by Jeff Simon noted, "this is a marvelous meeting of two of the freshest and most open-minded younger talents in jazz -- certainly the reigning specialists at radically revising great standards..."

Track listing

The Japanese release includes two additional tracks: "Come Rain or Come Shine" written by Johnny Mercer and Harold Arlen, and "Medieval Blues" by Mino Cinélu.

Personnel
Cassandra Wilson – vocals (tracks: 1 3 4 6 7 8 9 10) 
Jacky Terrasson – electric piano (tracks: 3 5), piano (tracks: 1 2 4 5 6 7 8 9 10 11) 
Lonnie Plaxico – bass (tracks: 1 3 6 7 8 9 10) 
Mino Cinelu – percussion (tracks: 1 2 3 6 7 8 9 10)

Chart performance

References

1997 albums
Blue Note Records albums
Collaborative albums
Cassandra Wilson albums
Jacky Terrasson albums